In mathematics, a hyper-finite field is an uncountable field similar in many ways to finite fields. Every hyper-finite field is a pseudo-finite field, and is in particular a model for the first-order theory of finite fields.

References

Field (mathematics)